Blavatnik Awards for Young Scientists was established in 2007 through a partnership between the Blavatnik Family Foundation, headed by Leonard Blavatnik (Russian: Леонид Валентинович Блаватник), chairman of Access Industries, and the New York Academy of Sciences, headed by president Nicholas Dirks.

These cash grant awards are given annually to selected faculty and postdoctoral researchers age 42 years and younger who work in the life and physical sciences and engineering at institutions in New York, New Jersey, and Connecticut. The first Blavatnik Awards were given in New York City on Monday, November 12, 2007. On June 3, 2013, the Blavatnik Family Foundation and the New York Academy of Sciences announced the expansion of the faculty competition to include young scientists from institutions throughout the United States. In April 2017, the Blavatnik Awards program was expanded to the United Kingdom (UK) and Israel. By the end of 2022, the Blavatnik Awards for Young Scientists will have awarded prizes totaling US$13.6 million; Blavatnik Award recipients have hailed from 48 countries across six continents.

 Blavatnik National Awards are for faculty-rank scientists and engineers in Chemistry, Physical Sciences and Engineering, and Life Sciences.
 Blavatnik Regional Awards are for postdoctoral scientists working in the fields of Chemistry, Physical Sciences and Engineering, and Life Sciences in New York, New Jersey, and Connecticut.
 Blavatnik Awards for Young Scientists in the United Kingdom are for young, faculty-rank scientists and engineers from Scotland, Wales, Northern Ireland, and England.
 Blavatnik Awards for Young Scientists in Israel are for young faculty-rank scientists and engineers early in their independent research careers.

U.S. Regional Postdoctoral Competition 

The regional program recognizes postdoctoral researchers working at institutions in New York, New Jersey, and Connecticut. The regional program accepts nominations for scientists working in the life sciences, physical sciences, mathematics, and engineering. Nominations are accepted from institutions in New York, New Jersey, and Connecticut. Submissions for the regional program are reviewed by a Judging Panel of senior scientists, science editors, and past Blavatnik winners from the Mid-Atlantic area. As of 2013, winners of the postdoctoral competition receive US$30,000 and finalists receive US$10,000, each in unrestricted cash prizes.

Past U.S. Regional Winners and Finalists

U.S. National Faculty Competition 

Beginning with the 2014 awards cycle, the national faculty competition accepts nominations for scientists working in three disciplinary categories: Life Sciences, Physical Sciences & Engineering, and Chemistry. Nominations are accepted from institutions throughout the United States. Members of the Awards’ Scientific Advisory Council may also submit nominations. Submissions are reviewed by a Judging Panel of senior scientists and past Blavatnik Awards winners. The awards are conferred annually with one winner (“Laureate”) from each disciplinary category selected each year (for a total of three Laureates per year). Each Laureate will receive a US$250,000 unrestricted cash prize and is honored at a ceremony in New York City every fall.

Past U.S. National Laureates and Finalists

Israel Faculty Competition 

In 2017 the Blavatnik Awards launched a national competition in Israel modeled on the U.S. Faculty awards. The Blavatnik Awards in Israel are administered by The New York Academy of Sciences in collaboration with the Israel Academy of Sciences and Humanities. Three Laureates from Israel are chosen each awards cycle and receive US$100,000 in unrestricted funds. The first awards were granted during a ceremony held at the Israel Museum in Jerusalem on February 4, 2018.

Past Israel Laureates

United Kingdom (UK) Faculty Competition 

In 2017 the Blavatnik Awards launched a national competition across the United Kingdom modeled after the U.S. Faculty awards.  A laureate and two finalists in each of three categories (Chemistry, Life Sciences, and Physical Sciences and Engineering) are chosen in the UK every awards cycle. In 2022, prize monies were increased for the UK competition and Laureates are awarded £100,000 and finalists receive £30,000. The first awards were granted during a ceremony held at the Victoria and Albert Museum in London on March 7, 2018.

Past United Kingdom (UK) Laureates and Finalists

See also 
 List of general science and technology awards

References

 

Science and technology awards